Nalbert Tavares Bitencourt (born March 9, 1974), known as Nalbert, is a former Brazilian professional volleyball player.

He was born in Rio de Janeiro.

With Brazil national team he won two World Leagues (2003 and 2004), one World Cup (2003), a World (2002) and one Olympic gold medal.

Sporting achievements

National team
 1995  South American Championship
 1997  South American Championship
 1997  World Grand Champions Cup
 2001  FIVB World League
 2001  South American Championship
 2001  World Grand Champions Cup
 2002  FIVB World League
 2002  FIVB World Championship
 2003  FIVB World League
 2003  Pan American Games
 2003  South American Championship
 2003  FIVB World Cup
 2004  Olympic Games
 2007  FIVB World League

Individual
 1999 World Grand Champions Cup – Most Valuable Player
 1997 World Grand Champions Cup – Best Scorer
 1998–99 Brazilian Superliga – Most Valuable Player
 2003 Pan American Games – Best Digger

External links
 
 
 
 
 

1974 births
Living people
Brazilian men's volleyball players
Volleyball players at the 1996 Summer Olympics
Volleyball players at the 2000 Summer Olympics
Volleyball players at the 2004 Summer Olympics
Olympic volleyball players of Brazil
Olympic gold medalists for Brazil
Brazilian people of French descent
Volleyball players from Rio de Janeiro (city)
Olympic medalists in volleyball
Volleyball players at the 2003 Pan American Games
Pan American Games bronze medalists for Brazil
Medalists at the 2004 Summer Olympics
Pan American Games medalists in volleyball
Medalists at the 2003 Pan American Games